Petrosalam is a joint venture company between the Government of the Arab Republic of Egypt, the Egyptian General Petroleum Corporation (EGPC) and the Arabian Oil Company (AOC) for exploration, development and production of oil inside the Northwest October Development Lease.

See also

 Energy in Egypt

Oil and gas companies of Egypt